Veterans Songs is the first studio album by the American Indian drum group Lakota Thunder. Recorded in Bismarck, North Dakota, Veterans Songs is meant to "honor warriors from the past to the present." The liner notes include a quote from Sitting Bull: "I was never the aggressor, I only fought to protect the children."

Track listing
 "Sitting Bull's Memorial Song" – 4:58
 "In a Sacred Manner I Come" – 4:15
 "Palani Olowan" – 4:15
 "Pehin Hanska Okicize Olowan" – 4:13
 "No Heart" – 2:21
 "Mila Hanska Ceya Natan Pelo" – 3:12
 "Lakota Hoksila" – 3:22
 "I Belong to the Long Knives" – 4:27
 "Flag Song/WW I Veterans Song" – 5:28
 "Six Islands" - 2:28
 "WW II Veterans Song" - 3:43
 "Korea Veterans Song" - 3:27
 "Veterans Song" - 4:02

Personnel
 Courtney Yellow Fat
 Dana Yellow Fat
 Wyman Archambault
 Frank Bullhead
 Kenny Bullhead
 Reuben Fasthorse
 John Gamiochipi
 Carlos Picotte
 Joe Picotte
 Leo Standing Crow
 Virgil Taken Alive
 Kristian Theisz

2000 albums